Alma llanera (English: "Soul of the Plains") is a 1965 Mexican Western drama film directed by Gilberto Martínez Solares and starring Antonio Aguilar, Flor Silvestre and Manuel Capetillo. It features Aguilar portraying his characteristic  film hero.

Plot
Two childhood friends, Juan Pablo (Antonio Aguilar) and Ramiro (Manuel Capetillo) meet again, but when a difficult situation arises, the friends are slowly turned into rivals. Complicating matters is Juan Pablo's love for Lucía (Flor Silvestre).

Cast
Antonio Aguilar as Juan Pablo Ureña
Flor Silvestre as Lucía
Manuel Capetillo as Ramiro Leyva
Manuel Dondé as El tuerto
Juan José Laboriel as Zampayo
Augusto Monterroso as Doctor Ramos
Claudio Lanuza (as Claudio Lanusa)

Reception
, 1919–1984 states about the film: "The film tries to reproduce a climate similar to that of Doña Bárbara.

References

External links

1965 films
1960s Spanish-language films
1965 Western (genre) films
Films directed by Gilberto Martínez Solares
Mexican Western (genre) films
1965 drama films
1960s Mexican films